USS Magnolia was a steamer captured by the Union Navy during the American Civil War. She was planned to be used by the Union Navy to patrol navigable waterways of the Confederacy to prevent the South from trading with other countries.

Service history 

Magnolia, a wooden, seagoing, sidewheel steamer built by J. Simonson of Greenpoint, New York for Charles Morgan's Southern Steamship Company. Launched in 1854, the ship was impressed as a public vessel in New Orleans, Louisiana, 15 January 1862, by Maj. Gen. Mansfield Lovell, CSA, acting for the Confederacy's Secretary of War Judah P. Benjamin. The South's original plan to arm her as a ram was dropped in favor of turning her into a blockade runner. In 1858 Floridian cattle man Captain James McKay Sr. of Tampa made a contract with the Morgan Line. This contract allowed McKay to use Magnolia twice a month at a price of $1,500 each run in order to ship cattle to Cuba, making Magnolia the first of many ships to be used in the same way. For this reason, the introduction of Spanish doubloons to Florida can be traced back to the trading trips made by Magnolia. Magnolia made at least two successful runs to nearby British islands in 1861 carrying large cargoes. On 19 February 1862, while trying to escape from Pass a' l’Outre in the Gulf of Mexico with a large cargo of cotton and rosin, in a dense fog, she was detected and chased by Union ships Brooklyn and Mercedita. After a daylong pursuit, Magnolia was intercepted and captured by South Carolina near the entrance to Mobile Bay.

After her capture, Magnolia was sent to Key West, Florida, where she was evaluated and condemned. She was purchased 9 April 1862 at New York City, by the Navy Department from the Key West Prize Court. After repairs, she commissioned at New York City 22 July 1862, Lt. William Budd in command. The sidewheel steamer departed New York 26 July 1862 to take station near Key West as part of the Union blockade. En route on the 31st, she captured British steamer Memphis near Cape Romain, South Carolina, bound ostensibly from Nassau, Bahamas, to Liverpool, England. Search produced papers revealing that she had actually departed Charleston, South Carolina, the previous night with a cargo of cotton and rosin. Aided by South Carolina, Magnolia convoyed her prize to New York City, arriving 3 August. After repairs, she sailed again for Key West. Operating off the coast of Florida with the Eastern Gulf Blockading Squadron, Magnolia took British schooner Carmita 27 December, and 2 days later seized a second blockade runner, British sloop Flying Fish, off Tortugas. By mid January 1863, repeated boiler problems slowed down Magnolia’s activities on blockade, and 15 July she sailed for New York for extensive repairs.

Magnolia sailed to rejoin the Eastern Gulf Blockading Squadron 25 April 1864, and patrolled off the Bahama Banks. On 10 September, she captured steamer Matagorda with a load of cotton, carrying no papers and flying no colors. She remained on blockade in these waters until February 1865, when she shifted to Apalachee Bay to blockade St. Marks, Florida. Four of the ship's sailors were awarded the Medal of Honor for accompanying a Union Army force during the Battle of Natural Bridge on 5–6 March 1865. The four men were Landsman John S. Lann, Seaman George Pyne, Ordinary Seaman Charles Read, and Seaman Thomas Smith. Magnolia put into Key West 15 March, and spent her last war days ferrying supplies to the ships maintaining the blockade. Magnolia decommissioned at New York 10 June 1865 and was sold at public auction to N. L. & G. Griswold 12 July 1865. Redocumented 23 August 1865, Magnolia served briefly as a merchantman and was abandoned in 1866.

References

Bauer, Karl Jack and Roberts, Stephen S. (1991): Register of Ships of the U.S. Navy, 1775–1990: Major Combatants, Greenwood Publishing Group, .
 
Joe A. Akerman, Jr., North Florida Junior College (1976): Florida Cowman, Jimbob Printing, Inc. Madison, Florida

Ships of the Union Navy
Ships built in Brooklyn
Steamships of the United States Navy
Gunboats of the United States Navy
1854 ships